Anna Arnautova (born 1 June 2004) is a Ukrainian diver. She represented Ukraine at the 2019 World Aquatics Championships held in Gwangju, South Korea. She competed in the women's 1 metre springboard and team events.

In 2019, she competed in the women's 1 metre springboard event at the European Diving Championships held in Kyiv, Ukraine. In 2021, she competed at the 2020 European Aquatics Championships held in Budapest, Hungary.

References 

Living people
2004 births
Place of birth missing (living people)
Ukrainian female divers
21st-century Ukrainian women